The Hay Islands are members of the Canadian Arctic Archipelago in the territory of Nunavut. They lie offshore of Milne Point, Prince of Wales Island, in the Parry Channel, Viscount Melville Sound.

References 

Uninhabited islands of Kitikmeot Region